Montdidier may refer to:

 Montdidier, Moselle,  Grand Est region, France
 Montdidier, Somme, Hauts-de-France region, France